Gyldenstolpia is a genus of rodents belonging to the family Cricetidae.

Species:

Gyldenstolpia fronto
Gyldenstolpia planaltensis

References

Akodontini
Rodent genera